The 2021 Scottish Open (officially the  2021 BetVictor Scottish Open) was a professional snooker tournament that was played from 6 to 12 December 2021 at Venue Cymru in Llandudno, Wales. It was the sixth ranking event of the 2021–22 season, and the third tournament in the Home Nations Series, following the Northern Ireland Open and English Open, and preceding the Welsh Open. It was also the third of eight tournaments in the season's European Series.The tournament was sponsored by BetVictor and broadcast by Eurosport in the UK and Europe.

The day before tickets were due to go on sale, the Emirates Arena in Glasgow informed the World Snooker Tour that the venue would not host an event sponsored by a betting company. Unable to find a suitable replacement venue in Scotland, the organisers moved the event to Wales. The qualifying stage of the tournament took place from 24 to 29 September 2021 at the Metrodome in Barnsley, England, although qualifying matches involving top-16 players and two wildcard entrants from the home nation were held over and played at Venue Cymru. In his first-round match against Lee Walker, Jimmy Robertson scored 178 points in a single frame, including 44 points in fouls, breaking the previous professional record of 167 set by Dominic Dale at the 1999 World Championship.

Mark Selby was the defending champion, having won the event in 2019 and 2020. By reaching the fourth round, Selby won 17 consecutive Scottish Open matches before he was defeated 3–4 by Anthony McGill. Luca Brecel, who had been runner-up at the UK Championship a week earlier, defeated John Higgins 9–5 in the final to claim the second ranking title of his career. Higgins lost his fourth consecutive final of the season, as well as his third consecutive Home Nations final. The highest break of the tournament was by Xiao Guodong, who made the first maximum break of his career in his qualifying round match against Fraser Patrick.

Prize fund 
The breakdown of prize money for the event is shown below:

 Winner: £70,000
 Runner-up: £30,000
 Semi-final: £20,000
 Quarter-final: £10,000
 Last 16: £7,500
 Last 32: £4,000
 Last 64: £3,000
 Highest break: £5,000
 Total: £405,000

Main draw

Top half

Bottom half

Final

Qualifying 
Qualification for the tournament took place from 24 to 29 September 2021 at the Metrodome in Barnsley, but the matches which involve top 16 players and the two wild card players were played at Venue Cymru. Zhou Yuelong was due to take part in this event, but withdrew and was replaced by John Astley. Ahead of the final stages, Neil Robertson and Mark Williams withdrew, and were replaced by Bai Langning and James Cahill respectively.

 (1) 4–1 
 1–4 
 (32) 4–3 
 4–2 
 (16) 4–2 
 4–0 
 1–4 
 1–4 
 4–3 
 (24) 4–2 
 4–0 
 (9) 4–3 
 2–4 
 (25) 2–4 
 4–3 
 0–4 
 (5) 4–0 
 4–2 
 (28) 4–1 
 1–4 
 (12) 0–4 
 2–4 
 (21) 4–1 
 4–1 
 4–2 
 (20) 1–4 
 3–4 
 (13) 1–4 
 4–2 
 (29) 3–4 
 1–4 
 2–4 
 (3) 4–2 
 0–4 
 (30) 4–3 
 0–4 
 (14) 1–4 
 2–4 
 (19) 2–4 
 0–4 
 1–4 
 (22) 3–4 
 4–3 
 (11) 3–4 
 4–2 
 (27) 2–4 
 4–0 
 (6) 4–3 
 (7) 4–1 
 1–4 
 (26) 4–3 
 4–1 
 (10) 3–4 
 4–2 
 (23) 4–2 
 1–4 
 1–4 
 (18) 4–1 
 3–4 
 (15) 4–0 
 4–0 
 (31) 4–3 
 2–4 
 (2) 4–0

Century breaks

Main stage centuries

Total: 39

 140  Fergal O'Brien
 139, 125  John Higgins
 135  Martin O'Donnell
 133, 118  Jimmy Robertson
 131  Jamie Jones
 131  Ronnie O'Sullivan
 130, 130, 113, 106  David Gilbert
 128, 115  Liang Wenbo
 127, 104  Luca Brecel
 127  Pang Junxu
 125  Gary Wilson
 120  Ryan Day
 117  Jordan Brown
 117  Xiao Guodong
 116, 107, 105  Mark Selby
 116  Li Hang
 113, 110  Anthony McGill
 113, 109, 105, 104  Judd Trump
 111  Zhao Jianbo
 108  Sam Craigie
 107  Sunny Akani
 107  Steven Hallworth
 104  Lei Peifan
 103  Hossein Vafaei
 101  Scott Donaldson
 101  Matthew Selt

Qualifying stage centuries 
Total: 36

 147, 108  Xiao Guodong
 135, 100  Mark Selby
 133, 100  Michael Judge
 133  Fan Zhengyi
 132  Jack Lisowski
 132  Ronnie O'Sullivan
 131, 113  David Gilbert
 130, 107  Kyren Wilson
 130  Shaun Murphy
 130  Robbie Williams
 126  Jackson Page
 125  Michael Georgiou
 121  Ricky Walden
 118, 115  Noppon Saengkham
 116  Oliver Lines
 116  Kurt Maflin
 115  Tom Ford
 114  Elliot Slessor
 112  Zhang Anda
 109  Thepchaiya Un-Nooh
 109  Chang Bingyu
 107  Mark Allen
 107  Stephen Maguire
 105  Si Jiahui
 104  Martin Gould
 103  Jak Jones
 102  Michael Holt
 102  David Lilley
 100  Mitchell Mann
 100  Judd Trump

Notes

References 

Scottish Open
Sport in Wales
Snooker competitions in Wales
Home Nations Series
European Series
December 2021 sports events in the United Kingdom
2021